Tetractomia is a genus of plant in family Rutaceae. It contains the following species (but this list may be incomplete):
 Tetractomia majus, Hook. f.

 
Zanthoxyloideae genera
Taxonomy articles created by Polbot